Yurii Fedorovych Shchyhol (born 5 November 1983) is a brigadier general, candidate of legal sciences, and head of the State Special Communications Service of Ukraine (Ukrainian: DerzhSpetsZviazku). He calls the current Russian-Ukrainian cyberwarfare to be the first world cyberwarfare.  He also defines Russia as a legal target for Ukraine's cyber attacks.

Biography 
He was born on November 5, 1983, in the village of Zazymia, Brovary Raion, Kyiv Oblast.

In 2006, he graduated from the National University of the State Tax Service of Ukraine, majoring in law.

In 2017 he finished Alfred Nobel University, majoring in finance and credit.

From 2007 to 2008, he worked in the Baryshivka tax inspectorate of the Kyiv Oblast.

From 2008 to 2009, he studied at the National Academy of the Security Service of Ukraine.

From 2008 to 2020, he served in the military in operational and managerial positions in the Security Service of Ukraine.

On July 8, 2020, by order of the Cabinet of Ministers of Ukraine No. 822-r, he was appointed the Head of the State Service for Special Communications and Information Protection of Ukraine.

Shchyhol also highlighted the importance of Starlinks provided by Elon Musk to Ukraine in renewing the communication to liberated areas of Ukraine from Russian occupiers.

References 

1983 births
Living people
Security Service of Ukraine officers